Meladema imbricata is a species of beetle in family Dytiscidae. It is endemic to Spain.

Sources 

Dytiscidae
Endemic insects of the Iberian Peninsula
Endemic fauna of Spain
Beetles of Europe
Beetles described in 1871
Taxonomy articles created by Polbot